Vanderlande is a material handling and logistics automation company based in Veghel, Netherlands and a subsidiary of Toyota Industries.

History
Eddie van der Lande established Machinefabriek Van der Lande in 1949. The company was based in the Veghel canal and produced unloading equipment including conveyors and cranes for various purposes. In 1963, the company entered into a partnership with the American company Rapistan which, in exchange of a stakeholding, licensed to the Dutch company automated material handling systems. The Van der Lande company was renamed Rapistan Lande. In 1988, the Rapistan Lande company was acquired by the Dutch company leadership and private investors through a management buy-out. In 1989, it adopted the Vanderlande name. 

From the late 1980s onwards, airports increased security, especially after the 9/11 attacks, with Vanderlande focusing most of its operations on selling equipment to them. 

In March 2017, it was announced that the company would be acquired by the Japanese conglomerate Toyota Industries. Toyota Industries agreed to pay , almost  at the time. The transaction was completed on May 20, 2017.

Operations

Vanderlande supplies material handling systems for airports, warehousing and the parcel distribution industry. , more than 600 airports in the world used Vanderlande's baggage handling systems, including 17 of the 25 largest airports in the world at that time.

Apart from its headquarters and "innovation centre" in Veghel, Vanderlande has additional production and service locations in the Netherlands, Belgium, Germany, France, Spain, the United Kingdom, Canada, China, India, South Africa, and the United States.

References

External links
 Official website

Toyota Group
Material-handling equipment
Industrial machine manufacturers
Business services companies established in 1949
Manufacturing companies established in 1949
Dutch companies established in 1949
Dutch brands
Multinational companies headquartered in the Netherlands
Companies of the Netherlands
Organisations based in North Brabant
Meierijstad